Master is a 1997 Telugu-language action film directed by Suresh Krissna and produced by Allu Aravind. The film stars Chiranjeevi and Roshini in the lead roles, while Sakshi Sivanand, Puneet Issar and Satya Prakash play supporting roles. The music was composed by Deva while cinematography was handled by Chota K. Naidu. Chiranjeevi for the first time in his career sang a song in the film. This is first movie in the Telugu film industry to have been recorded in DTS. Upon its release, the film became a commercial success at the box office.

Plot 
Janardhan Rao, a college principal, is keen on inculcating discipline in the students. He gets his protégé, Rajkumar, posted as a Telugu lecturer in the college. Rajkumar soon mingles with the students and becomes a comrade in arms and fools around with them, in order to control them. One of his students, Kanchana, falls for Rajkumar, and proposes to him, but Rajkumar refuses her politely, saying that she will rescind her proposal if she comes to know about his past.

Past: During his undergraduate in New Delhi, Rajkumar fell in love with Preeti, Janardhan Rao's daughter. When Preeti's fellow classmate, Vikram, proposed to her, she rejected his proposal, for which, Vikram killed her in a rage. In turn, Rajkumar killed Vikram and was sentenced to prison for five years. After serving the prison term, Rajkumar arrived back as a lecturer. 

Present: Rajkumar parts ways with Kanchana telling her that he cannot even think of loving any one else other than Preeti. One day, Rajkumar and Janardhan Rao come across Vikram, who was supposed to have been killed by him. Shocked, Rajkumar chases after him, but Janardhan Rao stops him and tells him that Preeti's killer is actually D. R., a notorious crime boss and Vikram's brother. When confronted by Rajkumar, Janardhan tells him that since he had already lost five years of his life, he did not want to rake the past by telling him what he learned just now, in fear of losing him again.

Janardhan also makes Rajkumar promise that he will not go after D. R. and Vikram. Helpless, Rajkumar accepts the promise and controls his anger. Later, Rajkumar's student, Dilip, falls in love with D. R.'s daughter. Mortally afraid of D. R., they both approach Rajkumar for his help in getting them married. He convinces Janardhan Rao about his involvement and takes his consent. In his attempts to get them married, Rajkumar confronts the goons sent by D. R. and Vikram. However, though he is successful, he ends up killing both the brothers and is again sentenced to five years in prison. Five years later, Rajkumar completes his prison term. He reunites with Kanchana and they happily get married, with the blessings of Janardhan Rao and his students.

Cast
 Chiranjeevi as Rajkumar / Master, Janardhan Rao's protégé
 Roshini as Preeti Rao, Janardhan's daughter
 Vijayakumar as Janardhan Rao, Rajkumar's mentor and Preeti's father
 Sakshi Sivanand as Kanchana
 Puneet Issar as Devaraju 'D. R.', Vikram's elder brother and a notorious crime boss
 Satya Prakash as Vikram, D. R.'s younger brother
 Venu Madhav as Venu
 Sivaji as Sivaji
 Tirupathi Prakash as Prakash
 Bandla Ganesh as Ganesh

Soundtrack

Reception 
The film was reviewed by Zamin Ryot. A critic from Andhra Today wrote that "The main attraction in the movie is a song by Chiranjeevi himself. Acting comes easily to him and he sailed through his role effortlessly".

Awards
Nandi Awards
Best Screenplay Writer -  Bhupati Raja

References

External links 
 

1990s action drama films
1997 films
Films directed by Suresh Krissna
Films scored by Deva (composer)
Geetha Arts films
1990s Telugu-language films
1997 drama films